Live Below the Line is an annual anti-poverty campaign, which challenges participants to feed themselves on the equivalent of the extreme poverty line for five days in order to gain an insight into some of the hardships faced by those who live in extreme poverty. It also raises money for poverty reduction projects across the globe.

The campaign began in Melbourne, Australia, in 2010 and has since spread to the UK, USA, New Zealand, Canada, and Colombia.

History
Live Below the Line was started in Australia by Rich Fleming and Nick Allardice from The Global Poverty Project and The Oaktree Foundation. They had been fighting poverty for a number of years and were worried about public awareness of the subject. The aim was to highlight the issue of extreme poverty and promote change for the world's poor.

Live Below the Line was created in June 2010 and its first campaign ran in August that year. Over 2,000 people participated and $520,000 was raised. By 2019 a total of $11.2m AUD has been raised in the Australian version of the campaign.

The Live Below the Line challenge has been taken by a number of international celebrities, including actors Hugh Jackman, Ben Affleck, Tom Hiddleston, and singer Josh Groban. Within Australia, the challenge has been taken by Federal Opposition Leader Bill Shorten, former Federal Treasurer Wayne Swan, actors Stephen Curry and Rhiannon Fish, Masterchef Australia winners Julie Goodwin and Kate Bracks, musicians Lindsay McDougall and Sarah McLeod, radio hosts Alex Dyson and Veronica Milsom, and 2011 Australian of the Year Simon McKeon.

Live Below the Line is run as a joint venture between The Global Poverty Project and The Oaktree Foundation.

How the line is calculated

In 2005 the World Bank defined the Extreme Poverty Line as $1.25 US a day – that is, someone would be considered to live in extreme poverty if they lived on an amount equivalent to somebody living in the United States, buying United States goods with US$1.25 a day. In 2011 (taking into account inflation and purchasing power), the equivalent amounts for the United States, Australia and United Kingdom are US$1.50, A$2 and £1 respectively.

The figure is determined by translating the 2005 figure into a local currency figure (using purchasing power parity) and then accounting for inflation since the 2005 date. A more detailed explanation of how the Australian figure was arrived at is available on the Global Poverty Project's site.

See also
Food stamp challenge

References

Anti-poverty advocates
2010 introductions